The Smithsonian Institution's Global Volcanism Program lists 105 volcanoes in Chile that have been active during the Holocene. The country's National Geology and Mining Service lists 90 active volcanoes.

The volcanoes of the Andes originate from the subduction of the Nazca Plate under the South American Plate, while the volcanoes of Chile's Pacific islands formed from magma coming from three distinct hotspots, Easter, Juan Fernández and San Felix hotspots. The westernmost part of the ridges formed by these hotspots contain the most recently active volcanoes. Some volcanoes or groups of volcanoes are under surveillance of the Southern Andean Volcano Observatory (OVDAS) because of their critical activity or proximity to big cities.

This list does not include Chilean claims in the Antarctic.

Gallery

See also 
 Glaciers of Chile
 List of fjords, channels, sounds and straits of Chile
 List of islands of Chile
 List of lakes in Chile
 List of rivers of Chile
 Lists of volcanoes
 Ring of Fire
 Volcanism of Chile

References

External links
 Search Database, Global Volcanism Program

 
Volcanoes
Chile
.